Phoenix Racing is a motorsports team that currently competes part-time in the ARCA Menards Series East fielding the No. 1 Toyota Camry and various Super Late Model events fielding the No. 51 Chevrolet SS for Jake Finch. Owned by Florida businessman James Finch, the team fielded NASCAR entries from 1990 through 2013. The team fielded a wide variety of drivers and often changed manufacturers, though it often maintained a relationship with Hendrick Motorsports. In Sprint Cup, Phoenix Racing was victorious just once in 251 starts over 24 seasons.

In 2013, Phoenix Racing was sold to Turner Scott Motorsports co-owner Harry Scott Jr., who renamed the team HScott Motorsports in 2014. Three years later, HScott Motorsports shut down. Phoenix Racing would reopen its doors in 2020 to help Finch's son Jake start his racing career in Outlaw Late Models locally in Florida, then moving up to Super Late Models in 2021, and moving up to the ARCA Menards Series East in 2022.

NASCAR Cup Series

Car No. 51 history

Early days
Phoenix Racing began racing in the Cup Series in 1990, when it fielded the No. 51 Plasti-Kote Chevrolet Lumina for Jeff Purvis. In four races, Purvis failed to finish a race, his best finishing being a 31st at North Wilkesboro Speedway. Phoenix attempted to run a full schedule in 1991, but soon cut back to a part-time schedule, completing six races in total. Due to a lack of funding, the team only ran two races in 1992, with Finch's company Phoenix Construction of Panama City, Florida, serving as sponsor. In 1993, the team ran all of the restrictor plate races on the schedule, except for the Daytona 500, for which they failed to qualify. For 1994, they picked up sponsorship from Country Time and had planned to run a limited schedule with Neil Bonnett driving. Bonnett was killed in a practice crash at Daytona before the 1994 Daytona 500, and Purvis was brought back to drive the car. In six races, his best finish was 21st. Phoenix changed its number to 44 in 1995, and ran six more races with Purvis and Jackaroo Sauce, only finishing one race. MCA Records became the new sponsor for 1996, and the team had two top-ten qualification starts, but could not finish higher than twelfth.

2000s: Part-time and Talladega win
After staying out of Cup for several years, Finch purchased a number of Ford Tauruses from Bill Elliott Racing, and ran all of the 2001 schedule's restrictor plate races with Purvis driving the No. 51, only finishing one race. In 2002, the team picked up funding from Miccosukee Gaming and switched to the No. 09. Driver Geoffrey Bodine had a third-place finish in the Daytona 500, and later had a 2nd-place qualification at the Pepsi 400. Mike Wallace ran a limited schedule for Phoenix in 2003, and had two top-ten finishes. Scott Pruett and Buckshot Jones also ran one race deals for the team that season, during which they switched to Dodge.

The team began 2004 with Johnny Benson Jr., who had also signed to drive the #1 car full-time for Phoenix in the Busch Series for 2002, scheduled to run at least a minimum of seven races, mostly at the longer speedways where the team was stronger. The team would attempt most of the schedule with Benson sharing the ride with Joe Ruttman, who had not raced full-time in the Cup Series since the early 1990s.

After Benson ran the Daytona 500, Phoenix came to Rockingham with their focus being on their Busch effort for the weekend. This was evident on the entry they filled out for the 09, where the team listed Ruttman as the driver but forgot to include Miccosukee as the sponsor. Finch did not even bring a proper crew to the race, with the intent being that they would run the Cup car for a few laps before pulling off and collecting the last place prize. Due to withdrawals from several teams, the potential field was reduced to 43 cars and this meant that every car that entered was assured of making the field.

For that weekend’s Cup race, the Subway 400 Ruttman ran one qualifying lap and was significantly off the pace, settling for a 40th place starting spot. To further complicate things, the crew Finch had assembled for the weekend was not in their pit box when the race began and once NASCAR discovered this, they ordered Phoenix to park the 09 for the remainder of the race. Ruttman collected $54,196 for a last-place finish. The team later said they would be "legitimate racing" after the incident, although Ruttman pulled out of each race he ran early citing some mechanical issue. Benson was eventually let go from his contract altogether and Ruttman’s involvement was scaled back significantly although he would return toward the end of the season and would eventually make seven starts for the team. Bobby Hamilton Jr. drove six races for the team starting at Charlotte, and Mike Wallace would return and record the team’s first top ten since 2002 at Richmond. Tony Raines would drive one race at Dover before retiring early, while Scott Pruett would make the race at Indianapolis but pulled out due in part to injuries received in a practice crash. Johnny Sauter would join the team for the last
few races after losing his ride at Richard Childress Racing, crashing out late in the running at Phoenix.

Sauter drove ten races in the No. 09 in 2005, and had a ninth-place finish at Phoenix International Raceway. Late in the season, Bobby Hamilton and Reed Sorenson drove the 09 at Martinsville and Homestead, respectively.

Beginning in 2006, Phoenix abbreviated the 09's schedule even further, switching back and forth between Dodge and Ford. Mike Wallace ran just three races and failed to finish higher than seventeenth. Mayfield ran the season-ending Ford 400, but did not finish due to an oil leak. Wallace had a fourth-place finish in the 2007 Daytona 500, but the team did not qualify for another race until the final two races of the year, when Sterling Marlin drove. For 2008, Marlin ran 10–12 races for Phoenix.

Phoenix Racing announced for 2009 that they would be running two different makes of cars for the upcoming Sprint Cup season. The No. 09 was shared by Marlin, Phoenix's Nationwide Series driver Mike Bliss, and Brad Keselowski, who at the time was a developmental driver for Hendrick Motorsports. Ron Fellows also ran as a road course ringer. The team fielded purchased Ganassi Dodges for Marlin and Bliss, and purchased Hendrick Chevrolets for Keselowski and Fellows.

After 19 years in the Cup Series Phoenix Racing finally won its first race, taking the Aaron's 499 with Keselowski behind the wheel. Keselowski turned Carl Edwards when Edwards attempted a second block on Keselowski's passing move, but Keselowski held his ground as Edwards wrecked and drove to the finish to lead his only lap of the day and win the race.

2010s: full-time and sale
Former Earnhardt Ganassi Racing driver Aric Almirola was hired to drive for the team in 2010. The team's competitiveness was put into question when it lost its longtime sponsor Miccosukee at the beginning of the season. Almirola failed to qualify three of the first seven events, including the Daytona 500, and start and parked in its four starts due to lack of funds. Almirola left the team after the race at Phoenix to focus on his Truck Series efforts, and was replaced by Mike Bliss and a handful of other drivers, including (Xfinity Series driver) Landon Cassill, (Former F1 driver) Jan Magnussen, and (2000 NASCAR Winston Cup Series champion) Bobby Labonte. Phoenix Racing returned in 2011 despite rumors that Finch had been trying to sell the team. Bill Elliott drove the first 4 races before Landon Cassill took over the ride with sponsorship from Security Benefit. In June 2011, prior to the Kansas race, the team changed the car number to No. 51, which Phoenix Racing originally used when it first competed in the then-Winston Cup Series. He would later have a best career finish of 9th at Michigan.

For 2012, Cassill was replaced by 2004 Cup Champion Kurt Busch, who had been released from the No. 22 car at Penske Racing due to on-track incidents and off-track temperament, including a profanity-laced tirade directed at ESPN reporter Jerry Punch. The team ran most of the season unsponsored, with HendrickCars.com, Monster Energy, and TAG Heuer coming on for single races. At Talladega in May, Busch ran a "ME" scheme from the movie Talladega Nights that Will Ferrell's character (a similarly controversial star driver) ran in a comeback at the track in one of the film's final scene. Busch's best finish with the team was an impressive 3rd-place finish at Sonoma Raceway after racing for the lead with Clint Bowyer with under ten laps to go. Outside of that high point, Busch was involved in many accidents trying to get the most out of his equipment. He was also suspended for the June race at Pocono after expletives aimed at a reporter after a Nationwide Series race at Dover. David Reutimann replaced Busch in that race, and Busch was welcomed back following a vote by team members. Busch would leave the team following the fall Talladega race for Furniture Row Racing, and was supposed to be replaced by Regan Smith (the former driver with Furniture Row) until Dale Earnhardt Jr. suffered a concussion in the aftermath of the Talladega race and Smith was needed as a sub for the Charlotte and Kansas races in the Chase. A. J. Allmendinger, coincidentally also released from Penske, in the No. 22 car, due to a failed substance test, drove the No. 51 for those two races, with Smith returning later in the year.

For 2013, the team returned full-time, fielding a number of different drivers. The team signed Guy Roofing, a company from the team's hometown of Spartanburg, South Carolina, as the sponsor for the Daytona 500 and two other early season races. Regan Smith drove the car in the 500 to a strong seventh-place finish, and would run five other races that season with a best finish of sixth. Allmendinger ran 9 races, including running the retro Country Time scheme Phoenix had run in the past, with three top 15 finishes all in his first four starts. Austin Dillon ran four races, and Ryan Truex made his series debut at Bristol in the fall. Bobby Labonte, Owen Kelly, Mike Bliss, Jacques Villeneuve, and Brendan Gaughan would all make single starts for the team in 2013.

In spite of early success (the team was ranked 9th in owners points after the fifth race of the season) and a more affordable car model in the Gen 6 Chevy SS, lack of long-term funding continued to plague the team.  Citing this recurring lack of stable sponsorship, Finch announced in May 2013 that he would close operations after the 2013 Brickyard 400. In late June, Finch announced that he was selling his team. The team found a buyer July 17 and Finch stopped sponsoring the team after Indianapolis. He would continue to own the team through Labor Day weekend, providing assistance in the transition to new ownership. It was announced on August 28 that Harry Scott Jr. of Turner Scott Motorsports had bought the team.

Finch's last race as owner was the Labor Day race at Atlanta, where Mike Bliss drove the No. 51 Phoenix Construction Chevrolet to a 33rd-place finish, running six laps down at the checkered flag.

Sprint Cup Series Results

Xfinity Series

Car No. 1 history 

Phoenix made its debut in 1989 with the No. 49 Buick driven by Jeff Purvis at Charlotte. They ran four races together the following season in the No. 15 car, but had three engine failures. The next season, Phoenix and Purvis ran four consecutive races in the No. 14/23 Seal-Tech Buick, with a best finish of seventeenth. After a seventh-place finish at Talladega in 1992, the team ran as the No. 28 Havoline Ford for three races, and then changed to the No. 4 Kodak Funsaver Camera Chevrolet in 1993. Purvis won his first pole at Talladega in 1994 as the No. 51 Country Time car, then switched back to the No. 4 Kodak car the next year, where he had three top-ten finishes.

Phoenix Racing made its first full-time season in 1996, despite the No. 4 not having major sponsorship. Purvis won two races and a pole position, finishing seventh in points. Purvis ran the first four races of the 1997, and had a top-ten finish, but was replaced by Tim Steele, who brought sponsorship from HS Die. He had two top-tens, but injuries forced him to exit the ride. He was replaced by multiple drivers, with Dale Shaw running a majority of the races that season, including a 2nd-place finish at South Boston Speedway. Sterling Marlin, Ernie Irvan, and Ron Fellows filled in for Shaw when he could not run. Kevin Lepage then drove two races near the end of the season, before Purvis returned to drive the last race of the year. In 1998, Purvis was again named full-time driver, with Lance Snacks sponsoring. Purvis made 26 starts, missing one race due to injury, during which he was replaced by Dennis Setzer, and an additional four races during which he was suspended for rough driving. Nathan Buttke and Matt Hutter took his place for those races.

Purvis and Lance Snacks departed for Bechtel/Gibbs Racing at the end of the year, taking the No. 4 with him. Phoenix Racing switched to the No. 1 and hired Randy LaJoie to drive. They did not have major sponsorship of start the season, and signed a one-race deal with Jani-King before winning the season-opening NAPA Auto Parts 300. Bob Evans Restaurants then became the sponsor, and LaJoie finished tenth in points. He followed that up with a victory at USA and a seventh-place finish in points in 2000. P. J. Jones was named driver of the No. 1 for 2001, bringing Yellow Freight sponsorship. After four races, he was replaced by Jimmy Spencer who drove in eighteen races for Phoenix, winning three races. Bobby Hamilton, Lepage, and Joe Ruttman filled in for Spencer on occasion.

Phoenix dropped to a part-time schedule in 2002, with Spencer winning twice in 23 races, with Martin Truex Jr. running one race. Ruttman also ran Talladega in a second car, the No. 51, which was involved in a massive pileup on lap 15 which took out most of the field, including Spencer. In 2003, they formed a partnership with Chip Ganassi Racing and fielded the No. 1 full-time for two Ganassi drivers: Cup series driver Jamie McMurray and developmental driver David Stremme. McMurray had two wins, both at Rockingham, while Stremme made sixteen starts with two top-fives, earning him Rookie of the Year honors.

Johnny Benson was named full-time driver in 2004, with Miccosukee Resorts being named the new sponsor. He won one pole and had four top-tens when he was released after ten starts. McMurray ran three of the next four races, and Purvis returned for one race at Nazareth Speedway. Buckshot Jones drove the next two races with the return of Yellow Transportation to the team, followed by Tony Raines, Casey Mears, Bobby Hamilton, Sterling Marlin, Reed Sorenson, and Regan Smith.

Johnny Sauter was named the permanent driver of the No. 1 in 2005, winning at Milwaukee and finishing twelfth in points after Boris Said took his place at the Mexico race. Sauter left for Haas CNC Racing and took the sponsorship with him, and Jason Keller was hired to drive. After eight races, Keller was released and replaced by Mike Wallace, who garnered two top-five finishes, with Scott Pruett and development driver Cale Gale filling in. For 2007, J. J. Yeley was named the new driver of the No. 1, but struggled and only had one top-ten finish and missed six races, with Benson, Marlin and Max Papis filling for most of those races.

In 2008, Sauter returned to the team, but was released after five races. After Sterling Marlin drove one race, Mike Bliss was named the permanent driver of the No. 1 car. Marc Reno, who was born in California and currently resides in Concord, NC, serves as the crew chief and manages the team. He returned to the car after a solid season in 2008 for a full 2009 campaign. On May 23, 2009, Mike Bliss scored his second career Nationwide win and eleventh win for the team at Lowe's Motor Speedway by taking advantage of fuel mileage and a race-ending caution near the end of the race because of rain. In August 2009, Bliss was released due to conflicts with Reno. Ryan Newman, Reed Sorenson, Max Papis, Martin Truex Jr., David Gilliland, and Landon Cassill also took turns sharing the ride following Bliss' release. Rookie James Buescher was to drive the car full-time in 2010, but Finch put his entire operation up for sale on April 24. On May 12, 2010, Newman drove the car at Dover after Buescher parted ways with the team.

On July 6, 2012, Phoenix recorded its first Nationwide Series win in three years when Kurt Busch, who would make occasional starts for the team that season, won the Subway Jalapeno 250 at Daytona for his fifth win in the series and his first for another team owner besides Roger Penske and Kyle Busch.

The No. 1 has 13 victories.

Car No. 4 history 
Phoenix Racing began running two cars in 2000, when Matt Hutter drove the No. 51 at Daytona and Talladega, with TracFone sponsoring; his best finish was 19th. LaJoie drove late in the season at Homestead, when P. J. Jones drove the No. 1. In 2005, they began fielding the No. 09 for three races, with Boris Said, Wallace, and Eric McClure driving. They began fielding the second car full-time in 2007, when Wallace drove the No. 7 GEICO Chevrolet. Despite failing to finish in the top-ten, he finished 11th in points. In 2008, the team switched to the No. 4, and leased its owners points to Jay Robinson Racing. Robinson ran the No. 4 car on a full-time basis, although Phoenix did field the No. 4 for Landon Cassill at Mexico City.

Gander RV & Outdoors Truck Series

Truck No. 5 history 
On March 3, 2020, it was announced that Phoenix Racing and both former Truck Series teams Billy Ballew Motorsports and Wauters Motorsports would jointly be restarted and returning to the series with Erik Jones running at Homestead as he sought the Kyle Busch 100,000 bounty. However, Ballew stated the team had no plans to return besides the one race. Following the postponement of the Homestead race due to the COVID-19 pandemic, Jones was announced to compete at Charlotte. Due to the cancellation of qualifying runs, he was unable to make the starting field.

ARCA Menards Series East
In 2022, the team made their debut in the ARCA Menards Series East. Jake Finch, the son of James Finch, made his debut in the No. 1 car at Pensacola. Finch would return to his family team and the No. 1 car for the East Series race at Nashville. He would start on the pole, lead 44 laps and finish second in the race. In both of his East Series races for Phoenix Racing, Finch drove an unbadged Toyota.

References

External links
 

American auto racing teams
ARCA Menards Series teams
Companies based in Florida
Auto racing teams established in 1989